Gerald Dwayne Wilson (born April 2, 1985) is a former American football cornerback in the National Football League (NFL) for the Carolina Panthers and Dallas Cowboys. He was drafted by the Panthers in the seventh round of the 2007 NFL Draft. He played college football at Baylor.

Early years
Wilson attended Terrell High School. As a senior, he contributed to the team having a 9-3 record, while making 37 tackles, 6 interceptions and 7 passes defensed. He was named All-district, 16-4A Defensive Player of the Year and the Terrell Tribune Co-Athlete of the Year.

He was a two-time All-district selection in basketball. He was the district champion and a regional qualifier in the high jump as a senior.

College career
Wilson accepted a football scholarship from Baylor University. As a true freshman, he appeared in 12 games as a backup cornerback, making 13 tackles.

As a sophomore, he appeared in 11 games with two starts, collecting 22 tackles (eleventh on the team), 3 passes defensed, one forced fumble and one fumble recovery.

As a junior, he started 11 games, posting 45 tackles (seventh on the team), 5 interceptions (tied for the lead in the conference), 5 passes defensed and one fumble recovery.

As a senior, he started 12 games, making 59 tackles, 4 interceptions (led the team), 6 passes defensed. He returned one interception for a 52-yard touchdown against
Northwestern State University.

He finished his college career after playing in 46 games with 25 starts, 139 tackles, 9 interceptions, 14 passes defensed, one forced fumble and 2 fumble recoveries.

Professional career

Carolina Panthers
Wilson was selected by the Carolina Panthers in the 7th round (226th overall) of the 2007 NFL Draft. He was waived on September 2 and signed to the practice squad to September 4. On November 14, he was promoted to the active roster. He appeared in 4 games, making 2 defensive tackles and 2 special teams tackles.

In 2008, he appeared in 4 games and was declared inactive in 12 contests. He had 3 tackles and one pass defensed.

In 2009, he appeared in 7 games and was declared inactive in 9 contests. He had 7 tackles, 2 passes defensed and one special teams tackle.

On September 4, 2010, he was released. On September 17, he was re-signed. He appeared in 8 games and was declared inactive in 7 contests. He registered 8 tackles, one pass defensed, 3 special teams tackles and one fumble recovery. On July 30, 2011, he was re-signed. On September 3, he was released.

Dallas Cowboys
On December 13, 2011, he was signed by the Dallas Cowboys to their practice squad. On August 27, 2012, he was released.

Personal life
Wilson's cousin, Lenzy Pipkins, also plays football.

References

External links
Baylor Bears bio

1985 births
Living people
Players of American football from Dallas
American football safeties
Baylor Bears football players
Carolina Panthers players
Dallas Cowboys players